Aldis Eglājs (born 6 February 1936 in Riga) is a Latvian multihull sailboat designer.

Designs

Catamarans
Centaurus 35
Centaurus 38

Trimarans
Catri 27
Catri 26
Catri 25 (2014)
Catri 24
Catri 23

See also
Catrigroup

References

1936 births
Multihull designers
Living people
20th-century Latvian inventors
Engineers from Riga